The list of shipwrecks of Cornwall (20th century) lists the ships which sank on or near the coasts of mainland Cornwall in that period. The list includes ships that sustained a damaged hull, which were later refloated and repaired. 
 For ships wrecked both before and after the 20th century see List of shipwrecks of Cornwall 
 For ships wrecked off the Isles of Scilly see List of shipwrecks of the Isles of Scilly.
 For ships wrecked on the Seven Stones Reef see List of shipwrecks of the Seven Stones Reef.

1901–1914

1901
 7 January – ketch Tenzer foundered off Padstow harbour after striking a rock. The crew landed on the ship's boat.
 19 January – schooner Marie Celine sank near Falmouth.
 4 February – The Padstow schooner Janie Vivian was driven ashore on the sands below Bray Hill in the Camel estuary. She was taking grain to Cardiff and all the crew survived.
 28 February – Porthleven sailing vessel Concord wrecked on the Outer Trigg rocks at the harbour entrance.
 14 March – The Amsterdam schooner Voorspoed ran aground near Chapel Rock, in Perran Bay. The crew escaped via the breeches buoy. The vessel was carrying coal and machinery from Cardiff to Brazil. 
 17 April – schooner Whinfield lost off Trevose Head
 18 November – Penzance schooner Mary James bound for Swansea from Newlyn with copper ore lost her mast and sails off the Longships and the wreckage was washed up on the Brisons the next day. The crew of six had been taken off by the Sennen Lifeboat Ann Newbon ( Royal National Lifeboat Institution).
 7 December - the sailing ship Rodney was wrecked on the coast of Cornwall on voyage from Iquique to France with a cargo of nitrate.

1902
 January – barque Glenbervie wrecked at Lowland Point near Coverack. She was heading from London for Port Elizabeth laden with 600 barrels of whisky, 400 barrels of brandy and barrels of rum. The 16 crew were saved by lifeboat.
 13 May – fishing vessel Devonia struck by SS Helmside and sank off Trevose Head with the loss of two lives.
 27 May – HMS Recruit struck rocks half a mile north of Cape Cornwall. Refloated and towed to Penzance by tugs.

1903
 4 February –  of Newcastle wrecked on the Runnelstone; the crew took to two boats one of which reached land and the other with five crew taken to Penzance in the Sennen Cove lifeboat Ann Newbon ( Royal National Lifeboat Institution)
 1 March – barque  on passage from New Zealand to Liverpool lost part of her mast and head gear off Pendeen, and drifted onto the Brisons in a north–west–by–west gale. All the crew were lost.
 11 September – Enterprize lost her sails and wrecked in hurricane-force winds off Western Spits, half a mile west of Hayle Bar. The three crew rescued by lifeboat.

1904
 1 September – steamship  on an excursion hit a sunken ledge off Carn Du and later beached at Lamorna Cove. The passengers had to walk the four miles back to Penzance. She was later salvaged by the Little Western Salvage Company who fitted her out as a salvage steamer and attended most Cornish wrecks over the next thirty years

1905

 15 March – the 1,967 ton barque  wrecked in Porth Loe under Tol-Pedn-Penwith. Neither the Penzance or Sennen Lifeboats could reach the ship and twenty-three crew are buried in St Levan's Church, St Levan Churchyard.
 5 July – Newlyn lugger Diana steamed into the Hamburgans Rocks off Penzance promenade when the watch fell asleep. Floated on the late afternoon tide.
 4 August – the 400 ton steel barque Noisiel was blown ashore in a violent storm at Praa Sands. She was en route from Cherbourg to Savona with a 600-ton cargo of armour plate from the gun turrets of obsolete battleships.

1906
 February – the Workington collier  almost wrecked on the Runnelstone and caught fire. Managed to make her way to Penzance where she was repaired.
 February – the St Ives pilot boat Buller with seven pilots on board, capsized, in St Ives Bay when she was hit by a schooner, throwing all her occupants into the water. No fatalities.

 21 July – the crew of the ketch  abandoned ship when she took on water 20 miles north of Trevose Head.
 31 July - the French ship Socoa was stranded off Kildonan Point, Lizard in dense fog, she was re-floated after jettisoning 50000 barrels of cement and beached in Cadgwith Cove. She was later towed round to Falmouth and repaired.
 23 August – the steamer  on a journey from her home port of Garston with coal, hit the Low Lee rocks in a thick fog one mile from her destination, Newlyn.

1907
 February – brigantine Julien Marie ran aground at Porthminster Beach, St Ives.
 17 March – the 12,000 ton liner  a White Star Line vessel ran aground in thick fog on the Maenhere ledges off Polpeor, Lizard Point. She was blown in half by salvagers using dynamite and the stern section taken to Southampton to be assembled to a new bow while the old bow was abandoned to the sea. Four lifeboats ( Royal National Lifeboat Institution) saved 456 people from the wreck (the largest number ever saved by the RNLI from a single vessel). She also carried a cargo of wool and mutton, with the wool being collected from beaches and coves, stored on Lizard Green and each man selling his salvage. Also see SS Skytteren in the List of shipwrecks in April 1942.
 17 October – schooner Susan Elizabeth wrecked on Porthminster Beach and the crew rescued by lifeboat. Remains dynamited two years later.
 1 November – Thames sailing barge the Baltic ran onto St Clement's Isle, Mousehole en route to Newlyn with cement for the harbour works. Her crew were saved by Mousehole fishermen on the crabber Lady White who were unimpressed with the non–appearance of the lifeboat stuck in the mud at Penzance. The Baltic ended her days as a hulk in an Essex creek.

1908
 7 January – Falmouth schooner Lizzie R Wilce wrecked on Porthminster Beach. The crew was saved.
 8 January – Barrow schooner Mary Barrow beached on Porthminster beach. The crew were saved and she was refloated a week later.
 6 March – the lifeboat at Newquay James Stevens No 5 ( Royal National Lifeboat Institution) capsized during a practice launch with the loss of one life.
 6 March – Isles of Scilly ship Charles Francis bound from Newport to St Mary's with coal parted her cables and was swept through Godrevy Sound and wrecked near Portreath. Her crew had been taken off by the St Ives Lifeboat ( Royal National Lifeboat Institution).
 6 March – after losing her captain near the Longships, the remaining crew of the schooner Hodbarrow Minor beached her at Mawgan Porth, while running before a force 10 gale. 
 20 May – SS  while on voyage from Montreal to London was in collision with SS  and sank near the Wolf Rock.
 4 October – steel barque Alice Marie hit the Runnelstone, drifted and sank in Mount's Bay where it is now a dive site.
 28 December –  of Liverpool in ballast was found lying broadside close to the shore at Porthcurno beach after dragging her anchor. She was towed off by the tug Blazer assisted by the Sennen Cove lifeboat Ann Newbon ( Royal National Lifeboat Institution).

1909
 January – fishing lugger FV Pendeen lost in a gale. A search by the St Ives Lifeboat did not find any wreckage
 3 February –  of Great Yarmouth in the area for the mackerel season ran ashore by Penzance railway station.
 May – schooner Loango en route from Southampton to Newport with a cargo of scrap metal dragged her anchor near St Ives. All four crew were saved
 unknown date –  swamped by a wave off St Ives. Three people swept overboard were rescued.

1910

 22 January – Indefatigablewhile under tow from Falmouth to Cardiff by tug Challenge, they hit heavy weather at Land's End and returned to Falmouth. During the night Indefatigable dragged her anchors and drifted ashore under St Mawes Castle. She was pulled off the rocks by tugs Briton, Dragon and Marian, towed to Falmouth Docks and sold for scrap.
 13 March – Brixham trawler Harry stranded at Porthcurno and taken in tow by the Sennen Cove lifeboat Ann Newbon ( Royal National Lifeboat Institution)
 May – trawler Olivia hit by HMS Quail off Porthallow. Four men from the village of Flushing died.
 5 September – steam cargo ship William Cory carrying a cargo of timber from Uleaborg to Newport was wrecked below Boscaswell Cliff, near Pendeen Lighthouse.
 10 October – schooner Olympe beached at Gunwalloe Church Cove.
 November – steamer Wimborne was wrecked under Carn Barra Point near Land's End; the crew were rescued by rocket lines from the shore.
 unknown date – ore carrying ship Febrero hit an unnamed rock to the north–east of the Runnel Stone; all hands were lost, bar the cook.

1911

 29 April – SS Cragoswald hit the Low Lee Reef off Mousehole on a journey from Barry Docks to Venice with 4000 tons of coal. The steamer was on a detour to drop the Chief Engineer at Penzance (for hospital), and mistook the Low Lee buoy for a similar looking one near Porthleven. Refloated.
 3 May – 1497 ton sailing ship  of Fredrikstad was wrecked at Housel Bay on the eastern side of the Lizard. Three men were saved by the Lizard lifeboat ( Royal National Lifeboat Institution) and the rest along with the Captain's family were taken off by rocket apparatus. She was bound for Sydney with building material and her cargo of steel and timber was washed up for weeks afterwards and used in many of the local cottages. One in Church Cove now bears her name.
 12 November – Irish Schooner, '', hit the Doom Bar. All five crew saved by the Padstow lifeboat Arab (.
 13 December – barque , of Christiansand, wrecked at Cudden Point in Mount's Bay. The ship was a total loss but the Newlyn lifeboat Elizabeth & Blanche ( Royal National Lifeboat Institution) took the crew of 13 men off when she was half a mile off the Greeb Rocks. The ship was bound for the West Indies and was the last big sailing boat rescued in Mount's Bay.
 29 December – 2,774 ton steamer  sank in Mount's Bay while on her way to the breakers yard with a cargo of coal.
 unknown date – Mousehole lugger Weatherall sank about four miles off the Longships when she collided with Lowestoft sailing trawler Trevone. All the crew, bar Paul Humphreys, managed to scramble aboard the trawler.

1912 

 February – barque Pindos was wrecked on the Guthen Rocks near Coverack. All twenty-eight of the crew were rescued by the Coastguard and the Coverack lifeboat ( Royal National Lifeboat Institution), and a few days later the ship broke up in a storm.
 11 February – Fleetwood trawler Maud drifted ashore at Pentreath Beach, near Kynance Cove when her tow from the tug Challenger parted. Her boiler and keel can still be seen at low tide.
 5 March – Bessie was forced to shelter in Newquay Bay during a strong north wind and drifted ashore when her anchor fouled. Two of the crew were saved by breeches buoy, the others clambered up the  cliff on the cliff ladder. The Truro registered three-masted schooner was on a voyage from Ballincurragh, County Cork to Penryn.
 21 March – SS City of Cardiff wrecked at Nanjizal, two miles south of Land's End. The Sennen Life–Saving Apparatus Team took the crew off by breeches buoy.
 6 April – Gunvor wrecked on Pedn-Men-an-Mor rocks, Black Head, The Lizard; the crew scrambled to safety.
 6 April – barquentine Mildred struck rocks at Gurnard's Head in dense fog and sank with her sails set. No lives lost.
 July – the steamship Transporter of North Shields with ballast from St Nazaire to the Tyne for coal went ashore south of Mousehole in thick fog. The salvage steamer Lady of the Isles hauled her clear and she resumed her journey undamaged.
 26 December – SS Tripolitania, was beached on Loe Bar, near Porthleven in 100 mph winds while in ballast from Genoa to Barry for coal. All of her twenty-eight crew, bar one, were saved and the ship was finally broken up for scrap after attempts to refloat her failed. Two of the crew of the Penzance Lifeboat Janet Hoyle ( Royal National Lifeboat Institution) died of pneumonia the following Thursday.
 unknown date – fishing ketch Triumph sank on the Doom Bar.
 ketch Elizabeth wrecked in Bude Bay. Her mast was removed and erected on Summerleaze Point as a flagpole.

1913
 4 April – ketch  Woolwich Infant of Falmouth was abandoned by her crew and went ashore near Land's End.
 14 April – while leaving Porthleven harbour against a south–westerly, the fishing vessel Ebeneezer (PZ 541) was wrecked on the Trigg rocks.
 April – Othos Stathos grounded on rocks off Godrevy and towed into St Ives on 24 April.
 15 May – 2144 ton barque Queen Margaret of Glasgow went ashore at Polpeor while awaiting orders from Lloyds Signal Station. Her cargo of wheat swelled causing her to break up. The crew escaped in the ship's boats while the captain and his family were saved by the Lizard lifeboat ( Royal National Lifeboat Institution).

 23 May – 1903 ton barque Cromdale of Aberdeen ran aground at Bass Point, The Lizard in thick fog while carrying nitrates from Taltal, Chile to Fowey. Her crew was saved by the Lizard and Coverack lifeboats ( Royal National Lifeboat Institution). A contemporary report in The Cornishman writes that the first lifeboat on the scene was from Cadgwith shortly followed by the Lizard lifeboat; there was no mention of the Coverack lifeboat. Broke up in SSW gale a week later.
 14 August – J Duncan of Cardiff and bound from her home port to Devonport with coal was stranded at Tol Pedn and abandoned by her crew.
 29 November – the 1276 tons steamer Ville du Temple in ballast from Nantes to Cardiff struck the Runnelstone in thick fog. She drifted north, with a damaged hull, and her crew abandoned in the ship's boat about a mile NNW of the Brisons when they sighted the Mercutio of Penzance. She finally drifted ashore at Porthmoina Cove, Zennor.

1914

 18 January – A class submarine  sank in Whitsand Bay, off Rame Head, while carrying out practice torpedo attacks with the loss of 11 lives.
 1 February - four–masted barquentine  struck the Whelps reef and sunk on the west side of Gull Rock, off Nare Head in severe weather with five rescued and nineteen lost. She was on voyage from ″Chili″ to Falmouth with nitrates. The mass grave at Veryan is the longest grave in Britain.
 15 March – barque Trifolium at Whitesand Bay, Sennen; six crewmen saved, five were drowned.

First World War

1914
 December – the 3,100 ton Cape Horner Asnieres ran aground under Castle Point, St Mawes while entering Falmouth harbour without a pilot. She was refloated the following month and returned to service.

1915

 16 April – the 72 ton steam drifter the Pearl was stranded at 0900 in fog off Penzance promenade while trying to enter Newlyn harbour. She refloated at 1630.
She was in ballast from Barry to Port Arthur, Texas.
 19 May –  was torpedoed and sunk by the German submarine ,, 13 miles north of Trevose Head. She was carrying coal from Cardiff to Livorno with the loss of two lives

1916
July
 18 July – 3,000 ton Glasgow steamer Neto grounded at Gurnard's Head while carrying hay and fodder to Cherbourg.
 20 July – 3,818 ton collier Enrico Parodi sank off The Carracks while being towed to St Ives by the Lady of the Isles. She ran aground off Gurnard's Head in dense fog and was re-floated by a salvage team working on Neto, which was wrecked two days previous. She was heading to Messina from Cardiff with coal.

October
 13 October – Henrietta wrecked on Loe Bar.

December
Report says she sank off St Ives, map shows north of Trevose Head.
 1 December – schooner  sunk 15 miles NW of Trevose Head by  while en route from Cardiff to Bordeaux with 245 tons of coal.

Unknown date
 ketch Arethusa was abandoned by her crew who were picked up by the Padstow lifeboat Edmund Harvey ( Royal National Lifeboat Institution) and assisted by the tug Helen Peele. She drifted and went ashore at Northcott Mouth one mile north of Bude. 
 ketch Acacia wrecked at Northcott Mouth
 schooner Lelia sunk, off Land's End, at approximately 50 01 00N 05 40 00W by a German submarine.

1917
January
She was en route from London for Swansea.

February
 1 February – smack Ada torpedoed by the submarine  NNW of Trevose Head.
 1 February –  torpedoed by the submarine  3 miles NNW of Trevose Head with the loss of ten lives. She was carrying stone from Caernarvon to Rochester.
 1 February – fishing smack  sunk by gunfire from the submarine  15 miles NW from Trevose Head
 8 February – St Ives fishing vessel  sunk by charges/explosives from the submarine  commander: Otto Steinbrinck 18 miles NNE of St Ives Head according to the text and circa 30 miles north of Pentire Point according to the map. Her crew of seven, set adrift in the jollyboat, were picked up by the SS Sheerness. 
 8 February – sailing ship  sunk by  ten miles west of Trevose Head.
UC–47 attempted to sink Fleurette without success and she ran aground near Navax Point. The five crew were not found.

March
She was on voyage from Cardiff to Nantes with coal.
No casualties.
 30 March – the crew of cargo ship  abandoned ship when she developed a leak north of Trevose Head.

April
 12 April – collier  sank NW of Bude Haven after a collision. She was en route from Santander to Troon.
 19 April –  of Ithaca with a cargo of coal went ashore near Pendeen. She refloated the next day and sank.
She was carrying 1600 troops, and a cargo of antimony and copper ore, gold bullion, and general cargo. There were no deaths.

May
 2 May – cargo ship  torpedoed by  six miles west of Trevose Head with the loss of 14 lives.
 2 May – fishing smack  captured and sunk by explosives by  five miles NW of Godrevy.
 18 May – steamship  sunk by a mine laid by  2.5 miles NW of Pendeen Watch with the loss of seven lives. She was in ballast Rouen to Newport.

June

August
 9 August – steamer  ) sank in a collision with Echo 16 miles SW of Trevose Head while on passage with coal from Swansea to Nantes.
She was carrying coal from Swansea to Dunkerquie.
 23 August –  carrying a cargo of coal from Penarth to Le Havre was torpedoed by  seven miles NW of Godrevy lighthouse with the loss of five lives.
 23 August –  torpedoed by  8 to 9 miles NE of Godrevy lighthouse with the loss of four lives. She was carrying coal from Port Talbot to Rouen.

September
 10 September – schooner  sunk by gunfire from  seven miles NNE of Pendeen Watch while en route from Ellesmere Port to Cherbourg with coal.
 10 September – schooner  sunk by gunfire from  seven miles NNE of Pendeen Watch while en route from Ellesmere Port to Cherbourg with coal.
 10 September – schooner  captured and scuttled by  eight miles NE of Pendeen Watch while en route from Runcorn to Cherbourg with coal.
 10 September – brigantine  sunk by gunfire from  while 20 miles NNE or St Ives. One of the lifeboats was also shelled and four of the six crew of Jane Williamson were killed.
 11 September – Dublin schooner William on voyage from Cardiff to St Brieuc with a cargo of coal was sunk by the submarine  4 miles NW by N of Crackington Haven. The crew were fired on but only there was only one casualty from shrapnel.
 11 September –  captured and sunk the fishing vessel  4 miles NW by W of Crackington Haven.

October

 9 October –  sunk by a mine laid by  while carrying coal from Penarth to Boulogne. Eighteen people lost.
 10 October – three masted sailing ship Carl was beached and abandoned in Constantine Bay while being towed to London during a storm. The wreck is visible at Booby's Bay.

November

December
 December – while helping the SS Osten of Copenhagen which had lost her funnel and part of her superstructure the Newquay lifeboat James Stevens No 5 ( Royal National Lifeboat Institution) capsized and was lost. Her thirteen crew were saved.

Unknown date
  drifted in the English Channel after being torpedoed by a German U-boat and sank east of Church Cove off the Lizard. She was carrying flour and wheat.
  wrecked at Northcott Mouth, near Bude.
  torpedoed and sunk by U-60 off Clodgy Point, St Ives.
She was taken in tow but broke loose and hit Lee Ore, part of the Runnel Stone reef.

1918
 7 January – The Type U 93 submarine  was originally thought to have been lost in the English Channel off Hardelot, Pas-de-Calais, France after 15 January with the loss of all 36 crew. Following the examination of the propellers of a wreck off the Lizard Peninsula, divers found that it is this vessel and not .
Six lives lost including the master.
 1 February –  torpedoed by  while on a voyage from Swansea to Odda with a cargo of tinplate and coal. She sank with the loss of three lives six miles NW of Trevose Head.
Scheduled Ancient Monument no. 906491 
 7 February –  was torpedoed two miles north–by–west of the Longships, while being piloted by the Sennen Cove lifeboat Ann Newbon ( Royal National Lifeboat Institution). She headed for shore and grounded with no loss of life.
 7 March – while in ballast from Fecamp to Swansea barquentine  sunk by gunfire from  5 miles NW of Trevose Head.
 18 March – sailing ship Brise sunk by gunfire from  3.5 miles north of Trevose Head while on voyage from Paimpol to Cardiff with pitprops.
She was out of Newport carrying coal.
 18 April –  torpedoed by  16 miles SW from Hartland Point with the loss of five lives.
 2 May –  was torpedoed by  18 miles NE by E from Trevose Head with the loss of two lives. She was carrying patent fuel.
 2 May – 1700 ton  of Tonsberg bound for Rouen from Swansea with coal hit the Outer Stone off Godrevy during an ESE gale. The 17 crew escaped in the ship's boat and was picked up by the St Ives lifeboat James Steven No 10 ( Royal National Lifeboat Institution).
 4 May –  was sunk by  1.25 miles southwest of Sharpnose Point while bound for St Malo from Cardiff with a cargo of patent fuel. Two lives lost.
 6 June – cargo ship  torpedoed by  13 miles NE of Trevose Head while en route from Cardiff to Rouen with coal.
 14 July or after –  has been identified as the wreck 10 miles NNW of Padstow by its propeller markings. The loss is unexplained and all 37 crew were lost.
She was en route from Rouen to Barry Roads in ballast.
 3 September –  torpedoed by  3 miles WNW of Trevose Head with the loss of five lives. She was in ballast en route from Nantes to Barry Roads.
 16 September – the armed cargo vessel  was torpedoed by  while en route from Penarth to Devonport with coal.
 5 November – the armed cargo vessel  beached at Penzance railway station after a gunfight off Land's End with a surfaced German submarine. While refloated and towed to Falmouth for repairs; an Admiralty tug Epic went on to the rocks, for two days. A second tug Blazer was later wrecked on the Isles of Scilly
 6 November – cargo ship  sunk by a mine off Bude Haven

1919–1939

1919
 17 March –  of Falmouth hit the Lee Ore Reef between the Runnelstone and Tol Pedn and was beached in Porthcurno Bay.
 29 April –  of Rotterdam foundered half a mile north–west of Aire Point while heading to Rouen from Carfiff with coal. Her crew took to the ship's boat and were picked up by the Sennen lifeboat  Ann Newbon ( Royal National Lifeboat Institution).
 30 November – one of three Royal Navy Armed Motor Launches under the escort of a destroyer on passage from Queenstown to Southampton suffered from a disabled engine in heavy seas off Land's End. HM ML No 378 towing hawsers parted on two occasions and she drifted towards the Longships. Her crew of nine took to a dinghy which capsized and four of five were picked up by the Sennen lifeboat  Ann Newbon ( Royal National Lifeboat Institution). Four other crew made it to the Longships and also rescued by the lifeboat.

1920
 January (or early February) – tug Arwenack was found ashore three miles north of Bude. Scheduled Ancient Monument no. 907688. 
 18 January –  SS Skjoldborg of Haugesund sank off the Lizard.
 March – several vessels ran aground in thick fog including the Lowestoft steam trawler  which ran aground on the Larrigan Rocks, Penzance. Refloated on the next tide.
 26 April – schooner Belmont ran aground on the approaches to Padstow.
 15 August – 2000 ton steamship  of Chicago hit the Lee Ore, part of the Runnel Stone reef and sank. She was carrying coal from Swansea to Copenhagen and her crew of 38 was picked up by SS Dunmore.
 30 August (or 23 August) – the cargo vessel Hickleton hit a rock near Gurnard's Head, Zennor, and was then driven ashore. The following day she floated off the shore and sank 50 yards from the shore and sank in 13 m. All thirteen crew abandoned ship and survived.
 22 September – motor fishing boat Our Boys of Porthleven drifted into the Longships and her crew managed to scramble on to the rocks and were taken off by the Sennen lifeboat  Ann Newbon ( Royal National Lifeboat Institution). Our Boy was late salvaged.
 12 November – the steam trawler  ran ashore 50 yards east of Porthleven harbour. She was towed into the harbour and repaired. According to Carter (1998) she was wrecked in January.
 19 November – the steamer  with a cargo of coal grounded while entering the outer harbour at Porthleven despite the harbour being closed because of the heavy seas. Refloated on the incoming tide and headed for Newlyn.
 2 December –  went ashore at Penzer Point near Mousehole.
 RFA Moorview hit the Runnelstone.

1921
 23 August – the ex Naval patrol vessel ML498 was stranded on rocks at Gurnard's Head and went to pieces within a week
 November – the steamship  (Greek: Γιαννάκης) travelling in ballast from Rouen to Fowey and stranded on the eastern side of Praa Sands. Driven further ashore by successive gales, she was refloated in January 1922 by The Lady of the Isles and Greencastle of the Little Western Salvage Company. (see also 1922)
4 November - : The cargo ship departed Penarth, Glamorgan, United Kingdom for Rouen, Seine-Maritime. She later foundered in the Bristol Channel. The bodies of six of her crew washed up on the north coast of Cornwall.

1922
 3 March - French trawler, the Marguerite was wrecked at Talland Bay. Two private boats performed a dramatic rescue and all 21 people were saved. The remains of the ship's boiler can still be clearly seen on the beach at low tide.
 17 March - the cargo ship  ran aground at Praa Sands. She was later refloated. (see also 1921)
 21 May – 1968 ton tanker St Patrice of Swansea stranded on the Mulvin Ledges, Lizard Point in thick fog. Her crew of 23 were saved by the Pinney. She sank in the North Sea while being towed to Germany for repairs.

1923

 23 February - the 1529 ton barquentine  was wrecked at Green Lane Cove, Bass Point, in a severe gale while carrying insufficient ballast and on her maiden voyage. All her crew were saved by breeches–buoy. Many forks and spoons were washed up and used for many years.
 June – 993 ton steamer Nivelle of London steamed into Pentreath, near Kynance Cove in thick fog. Her crew was taken off by the Pilley and her cargo of coal was salvaged and carried up the cliff by the locals.
 29 September – steamer Gutfield of Hamburg bound for Cardiff from London ran aground near Cape Cornwall. She was refloated and steamed to Falmouth for repairs.
 8 October – the 6,000 ton City of Westminster bound from Belfast to Rotterdam with a cargo of South African maize knocked the top of the Runnelstone reef clean off. A total of 48 people were taken off by the Sennen and Penlee lifeboats and a further 25 in the ship's boat were towed to Newlyn by the steam drifter Pioneer. Today the remains lie in 30 metres of water, jammed into a gully on the eastern side of the stone.

1924
 August – Cardiff collier  grounded on Mousehole Island. Later towed to Penzance by the Greencastle, a salvage ship belonging to the Western Marine Salvage Company.
 31 August – White Star liner Bardic  of Liverpool was wrecked on Maenheere, Lizard, near where her sister ship the Suevic went ashore in 1907. Her crew of 93 were brought ashore in the Lizard lifeboat (Royal National Lifeboat Institution) and 44 returned to keep the refrigerators running and her cargo of rabbits, frozen. On 8 September with increasing winds the lifeboat took the crew ashore and her refrigerators stopped working. Bardic was towed to Falmouth and her cargo of rotting rabbits was dumped down a mineshaft near St Day!

1925
 28 February – steamer  was abandoned in the Atlantic Ocean off Land's End, and her crew were rescued by the tanker British Chancellor. She ran aground near Compass Point, Bude when her tow parted.

1926
 17 March – steamer Fagerness sank off Trevose Head after she was run down by steamer Cornish Coast.
 20 March – schooner  of Barrow carrying coal from Barry to Truro struck rocks near Cape Cornwall and refloated on the rising tide. With a member of the Sennen Cove lifeboat crew ( Royal National Lifeboat Institution) acting as a pilot she safely got away from the shore.

1928
 October – schooner S F Pearce spent a few hours under Trewavas Head, Mount's Bay in a southerly gale. The crew managed to get the engine going and clear of the rocks

1929
 17 April – freighter Archangelos wrecked on Dolor Point. 
 30 June – steamship  of North Shields bound for Constantinople from Swansea with coal went ashore near Cape Cornwall. All the crew survived.
 5 December – the 1200 ton collier Ornais II driven ashore at Perranuthnoe in hurricane-force winds. She was on her way from Le Havre to Port Talbot to pick up coal.
 5 December – the King Harry Ferry was rammed by a coal elevator and sank at her moorings. Later refloated and repaired

1930
 29 March – Submarine HMS L1 wrecked at Cape Cornwall.

1931
 September – Lyminge ran aground on Ebal Rocks off Gurnard's Head. The crew and passengers rowed ashore, the ship's cat was rescued later.
 3 November – the schooner Sainte Annen went ashore while attempting to enter Porthleven harbour, for repairs, while on a voyage from Port Talbot to Vannes with coal. All six crew were saved by the local rocket brigade.

1932
 unknown date –  on voyage from Bristol to Penzance grounded in fog near Cape Cornwall. The fourteen crew and one passenger rowed ashore to safety.
 October – schooner Sarah Evans near Porthtowan, the three crewmen were rescued

1934
 15 July – Brixham fishing ketch  caught fire while trawling off the Wolf Rock lighthouse. Crew picked up by the Brixham smack Radiance which was fishing nearby.

1935
 25 January – SS  went ashore on the east side of the sandbank inside Anjove Point at Hayle with a cargo of coal and refloated on the evening tide.
 January – 53 ton Bideford ketch Cicelia broke her moorings in St Ives harbour and collided with numerous vessels. Broke up on Pednolva Rocks. She had delivered coal from Lydney and was waiting for the weather to improve.
 24 February –  bound from Cardiff went aground on a sandbank at her destination port, Par. She was carrying 2000 tons of coal.
27 March – trawler Le Vieux Tigre stranded on the rocks at Beast Point, The Lizard. The crew of eighteen were taken off by the Lizard Lifeboat, the Duke of York ( Royal National Lifeboat Institution).
 20 June – : The tanker ran aground on the Crane Ledges at Lizard Head in fog. Her crew of 43 and a baby were landed at Polpeor by the Duke of York ( Royal National Lifeboat Institution) All 38 crew were rescued the next day by the Penzance Lifeboat.
 26 September –  of Glasgow: the cargo ship ran aground at Hot Point, near Lizard Point with a cargo of maize. Her fittings were sold by auction on Cadgwith beach and she was considered a danger to shipping and blown up and sunk.
 21 October – P.L.A. No.6 the dredger foundered in the Bristol Channel off Pendeen.
The crew were rescued by a fishing vessel.
 25 December – schooner Loustic of Libourne ran ashore on rocks east of Gyllyngvase Beach, Falmouth. Bound from Quimper for Cardiff to collect coal, her crew lowered a ladder and walked up the beach. She broke up a few days later.

1936
 27 January –  of London hit the Gear Rock, off Penzance promenade while heading to Newlyn to pick up roadstone. All nine crew saved. Broke up and sank three days later.
 February – ketch  ran aground at Padstow and became a total loss.
 10 February – the crew of four (and dog) of the ketch  of Brest were picked up in Whitesand Bay by the Sennen Cove lifeboat Newbons ( Royal National Lifeboat Institution).
 1 November – SS Bessemer City wrecked at Clodgy Point, St. Ives. All crew rescued, cargo salvaged by local people after washing up on beaches and said to have fed them for months.

1937
 11 January – trawler Vierge Marie of Ostend wrecked under Tregiffian Cliffs in thick fog while heading for Newlyn from the fishing grounds. Two men were saved by the rocket apparatus and the Penlee Lifeboat ( Royal National Lifeboat Institution) picked up three men although one died later.
 16 March - : The R-class destroyer ran aground at Flushing, Cornwall while under tow to the breakers. Declared unsalvageable, the wreck was scrapped in situ in 1940.
 1 July – steamer sail ship Aida Lauro on voyage from Liverpool to Hull went aground on Castle Rocks near Cape Cornwall in dense fog. All seventeen crew saved by the St Ives lifeboat ( Royal National Lifeboat Institution).

1938
 31 January – : Ran aground at Porthmeor Beach near St Ives. All 23 crew rescued after a wait of seven minutes while they packed their suitcases, but five later drowned when the lifeboat Caroline Parsons ( Royal National Lifeboat Institution) capsized. The remaining men were saved by the Life Saving Apparatus (LSA) crew and bystanders.
 18 December –  sheltered in Whitesand Bay from a south–easterly gale while bound from Cardiff to Brest with a cargo of coal. The crew were taken off by the Sennen Cove lifeboat Newbons ( Royal National Lifeboat Institution) and the schooner was not seen again.

1939
 2 January – HMS Medea: The  parted her tow and was driven ashore at Trebetherick Point, near Padstow with the loss of one of her four crew.
 21 or 24 January –  ran aground at Wicca Pool, Zennor. All crew lost. The unnamed steamer mentioned below may be this ship
She capsized three times off Clodgy Point, The Island and Godrevy Point. Only one member of her eight crew survived.
The crew were rescued by the trawler Roger Robert. Reported on 7 February at

Unknown date
 : The collier ran aground on The Lizard, Cornwall and was wrecked.

Second World War

1939
 10 December – collier  ( Stanhope Steamship Co) was scuttled in the shallows of Carrick Roads when her cargo of coal caught fire. She slid down the slope and attempts to refloat her were unsuccessful although her cargo was recovered.

1940
 31 May –  torpedoed off west Cornwall.
 1 July – ocean liner  ( Blue Star Line) torpedoed by the German submarine U-43 on 30 June, sank the next day.
 10 July – tanker : was bombed by Luftwaffe aircraft and sank in Falmouth harbour.
 10 July – steamer Marie Chandris, carrying a cargo of raw cotton was set on fire during a bombing raid. She was towed to a small bay near St Mawes and sunk by gunfire. She was later re-floated and beached at Place where some of her cargo was salvaged, and she was cut up for scrap.
 10 July – cargo ship  was bombed by Luftwaffe aircraft and sank in Falmouth harbour. She was refloated on 29 August and beached at St Just, but declared a constructive total loss and her superstructure was cut and towed to Freeman's yard, Penryn in November.
 3 October – former Isles of Scilly ferry the Lady of the Isles, requisitioned by the Admiralty as an Auxiliary vessel and sunk by a mine off Killigerran Head near Falmouth, together with the tug Aid. Six ships in as many weeks were sunk off Falmouth by mines.
 24 November – Belgian trawler Simone Marguerite sunk by gunfire while fishing in Mount's Bay. Her crew were picked up by another trawler Roger Denise.
 25 November – a small convoy of two steamers and a tanker from Plymouth attacked by German destroyers in Mount's Bay. Tanker  sunk by the [[German destroyer Z20 Karl Galster|Karl Galster]]. Fourteen crew killed and 20 survivors. Steamer  left afloat, when the German destroyers left, but not seen again.
 25 November – lifeboats from Sennen, Penlee and the Lizard searched for survivors of a naval and air battle ten miles off the Wolf Rock lighthouse but nothing found apart from a large patch of oil.
 26 November – patrol boat  torpedoed and sank off Rame Head with the loss of forty-one crew.
Under artillery fire and hit by torpedo she lost her bow and stern and was towed back to harbour where she was repaired.
 Unknown date – requisitioned trawler Royalo sank at the entrance to Penzance harbour while clearing a string of magnetic mines. Nine survivors.

1941
 1 February –  hit a submerged object north of Trevose Head.
 8 March – steamer  sunk and collier  heavily damaged by aircraft in Mount's Bay.
 16 March – steamer  struck a mine and sunk 10–12 miles north of Crackington Haven.
 25 March –  Sunk by bombing 12 nm NE Godrevy.
 14 April –  of Antwerp bombed and sunk off Cape Cornwall. Of her twenty crew seventeen survived.
 5 May –  foundered NW of Trevose Head.
 27 May – Ocean boarding vessel  bombed six miles north–west of Sennen Cove by four enemy planes. The crew were picked up by a Sennen Cove fishing boat Ruby.
 27 May – cargo ship  sunk between Trevose Head and Hartland Point after being attacked by a German aircraft. Six men lost.
 10 July –  sunk in an air raid seven miles north of Kellan Head.
 cargo vessel Botne foundered eight miles WNW of Bude. Scheduled Ancient Monument no 1232497.

1942
 20 March – steamer  carrying 450 ton of scrap iron from Southampton to Swansea sunk in an air raid off Trevose Head with the loss of one crew.

1944
 5 January – a small convoy (WP457) under escort by the destroyer  attacked by German E-boats which were lying in wait under the shelter of land between Porthcurno and the Runnelstone. Escort trawler  torpedoed, steamer  blown up, steamer  sunk (14 survivors) and the Cornish owned coaster  went down with all 11 crew killed.
 6 January – several ships in different convoy, to that mentioned above, sunk by E-boats and crews rescued by the Penlee lifeboat.
Over half of her crew were lost.
Freighter  and corvette  torpedoed. Scheduled Ancient Monument no.1102944

1945
 21 January – liberty ship  torpedoed four miles south–west of the Longships. All but two of the crew saved and the ship was towed to Falmouth.
 24 February – Sennen Cove lifeboat Newbons ( Royal National Lifeboat Institution) found the wreckage of an unnamed torpedoed ship.
 15 March – liberty ship  torpedoed and sank off Whitsand Bay. Now a popular dive site.
The U-boat herself was sunk by the escort of a nearby convoy with no survivors. This was the last enemy action near Mount's Bay.
 22 March – steamer  of Greenock torpedoed seven miles north–west of Sennen Cove. All 49 crew transferred to the Sennen Cove lifeboat Newbons ( Royal National Lifeboat Institution).
 29 March – corvette  was torpedoed four miles north–north–west of Pedn–men–dhu.
 April –  sunk off The Lizard in a British minefield (Artizan B3, part 1). She was previously reported to be sunk in the British minefield (HW A1) to the north of Trevose Head with the loss of 52 crew.

1945–1965

1946
 5 February – collier  hit the Mouls off Pentire Point
 16 March – Finisterre: Fishing vessel driven ashore at St. Ives. Three crew killed.
 8 May – while sheltering in Mount's Bay from an easterly gale, the 4765 ton light cruiser Diomede drifted onto the Larrigan, rocks and stranded at low tide. Refloated several hours later she continued on her journey from Falmouth to the Clyde for scrapping.
 June –  ran aground on Porthminster Beach, St. Ives while under tow to breakers yard. Later refloated and continued her journey.
 5 October – while on tow from shore establishment HMS Hornet,  was wrecked near Millook Haven and abandoned as a total loss.

1947
 22 March – schooner Empire Contamar: Ran aground in St Austell Bay. Seven crew rescued by the Fowey lifeboat ( Royal National Lifeboat Institution). Refloated in June and declared a constructive total loss but rebuilt as a coaster and returned to service.
 23 April – in storm-force winds, the tug Bustlers hawser parted and the tug Melinda III slipped hers, leaving  to run aground while being towed to the breakers yard. She initially beached on the Mount Mopus Ledge near Cudden Point. Later refloating herself, she went hard aground a few yards away in Prussia Cove and was partially scrapped. In 1950 she was towed to, beached and broken up at Marazion.

1948
 25 June – fishing vessel  (PZ 114) was hit by the American steamer  in thick fog ten miles SSE of the Lizard. Of the six brothers on board, five were killed. One holidaymaker on a fishing trip was also killed.
 11 October – fishing vessel  of Camaret sank after colliding with  eight miles north–west of the Longships. There was one survivor.
 26 October – the forepart of the steamer  while being towed by the tugs  of Hull and  started to sink three miles south of the Longships. Four men rescued by the Sennen Cove lifeboat Susan Ashley ( Royal National Lifeboat Institution). The Empire Flamingo was sunk as a blockship on one of the Normandy beaches in February 1944.
 1 November – motor tanker  of Rouen ran aground at Penberth Cove while bound for Irvine from Nantes in ballast. She was found bottom up and eleven of her twelve crew drowned.

1949
 unknown date – cargo ship  scuttled off Gwennap Head.
 unknown date – Northern Lights came ashore on Tavern beach, St Mawes and later re-floated.

1950
 the salvage boat  standing guard overnight under the Warspite's bows, at Prussia Cove was holed in the engine room, towed off and eventually drifted ashore at Long Rock, a few miles to the west.
 Steamer   ran aground at St. Ives Head while bringing coal from Barry to Hayle. All crew saved and she was refloated the following day.

1952
 10 January –  was a 6,711 ton Type C1-B ship which sank 31 nautical miles (57 km) south of The Lizard. On voyage from Hamburg to New York she suffered structural damage on 25 December 1951 during a storm while in the Western Approaches. She was escorted by American naval ships but finally sank in the English Channel. There was much speculation in the media about her cargo. According to the Coastguard log book her tow from the Turmoil parted and she foundered and capsized.
 17 January – steamship  hit the rocks under Pendeen Watch while on voyage from Newport to La Goulette. All the crew was saved and the wreck was salvaged. 
 2 October – minesweeper  snapped her anchor chain and went aground between St Ives Harbour and Porthminster beach in a 60 mph gale. All the crew were saved by breeches buoy. She was refloated and towed to Devonport.

1954
 27 July – coaster  bound from Cardiff to Ostend with coal struck rocks near Gurnard's Head. The crew and dog were saved by breeches buoy.

1956
 2 January – : The collier sank off The Lizard, Cornwall. All ten crew were rescued, but one later died.
 14 March – trawler Vert Prairial of Dieppe driven ashore at Wireless Point, Porthcurno. All seventeen crew lost.
 8 July – : The 827 ton steamship stranded in dense fog on the rocks of Trevean Cove, while carrying cement between Cliffe and Bristol. The captain believed he was near the Brisons at Cape Cornwall.

1957
 unknown date – St. Ives fishing lugger  grounded at Pedn-vounder Beach near Porthcurno in fog while heading for Newlyn with pilchards. The ship was a total loss but the crew climbed the cliffs and walked to the village of Treen with their catch, nets and fishing gear worth over £1000.

1958
 15 August – fishing vessel Hesperian hit an underwater ledge between Carn Du and Penzer Point, west of Mousehole. Penlee lifeboat W & S ( Royal National Lifeboat Institution) towed her to Newlyn harbour.

1959
 1 April – crabber Pluie de Rose was wrecked at Trevedran Point, St Loy. The skipper swam ashore to raise the alarm at a farm. Two men were saved by breeches buoy and four men were picked up by the Penlee Lifeboat ( Royal National Lifeboat Institution) in a small boat.

1961
 13 December – tanker  (Everard F T & Sons Ltd) while en route from Le Havre to Stanlow struck Greeb Point to the east of Caerhays Castle and hit the shore at Porthluney Cove below the castle.

1962
 3 November – Dieppe trawler  wrecked on Dr Syntax's Head, Land's End. The crew were trapped in an air pocket in the wheelhouse for six hours until low tide when they were rescued by the Life Saving Apparatus and Whirlwind Helicopter. Of the crew of eighteen, twelve lost their lives.
 29 December – 6000 ton coaster Ardgarry capsized off the Lizard with the loss of all the crew.
 unknown date – 259 ton Dieppe trawler  beached near Zennor Cove. The crew were taken off by breeches buoy and she was towed off the rocks by the St Ives lifeboat.
 unknown date – a motor cruiser Paulina wrecked on rocks near Gartul, Porthleven.

1963
 13 September –  bound from Swansea to Belgium with coal ran aground in fog at Portheras Cove, near Pendeen Watch lighthouse. The wreck was later blown apart by explosives in an attempt to break the ship up for scrapping. However, some speculate that the charges were inexpertly placed or too powerful. This led to the ship being spread over most of the beach. Pieces of Alacrity can still be seen, specifically a large piece of hull plating in the stream at the access point to the cove. There is a warning board in place warning visitors of the potential of sharp fragments in the sand. 
 23 October – Juan Ferrer ( Spain) wrecked under Boscawen Point, near Lamorna with the loss of eleven of her fifteen crew. A few days later the Newlyn and Mousehole Fishermen's Association wrote to Trinity House suggesting a light and foghorn at Tater Dhu which was first lit in 1965.

1964
 24 March – 90 ton trawler  of Ostend caught fire and went ashore at Gamper Cove, Land's End. The Sennen Cove lifeboat Susan Ashley ( Royal National Lifeboat Institution) herself grounded while taking off the five man crew.

1966–2000

1966
 April – the small coaster Saba was aided by the Scillonian (ferry from Penzance to Scilly) after her steel cargo shifted and she sank off Porthgwarra.
 31 July – the pleasure cruiser Darlwyne, chartered from Greatwood, a then hotel near Restronguet, to take guests on a day trip to Fowey. She set out on the return voyage but was never seen again; all on board, 23 adults & 8 children, perished. An investigation found the captain, Brian Michael Bown, to have acted negligently in ignoring local advice to remain in port; consequently the owner John Campbell Maitland Barrett was required to pay £500 towards the cost of the investigation. Traces of the wreck of the Darlwyne were reportedly found near Dodman Point on 31 July 2016 (exactly 50 years after its disappearance) by divers collaborating with the makers of the BBC's Inside Out South West.

1967
 18 March – Tanker  Ran aground on Pollard's Rock on Seven Stones Reef between Lands End and the Isles of Scilly, causing one of the world's largest oil spills.

1969
 12 May – Tanker Hemsley 1 ran aground in thick fog at Fox Cove, near Treyarnon Bay and was close enough to the coast for most of her crew to scramble on to the rocks and up the cliff. She was on her way from Liverpool to a breakers yard in Antwerp. Originally launched as the Scotol, she was renamed to Hemsley 1 on 21 June 1948, and was at the time of her wreck, the oldest registered British steamship. She had originally reported she had foundered at the Lizard after mistaking Trevose Head lighthouse for the Lizard light.

1970
 fishing boat  went aground at Mousehole.

1971
 14 October – barge  was being towed from Santander to Rotterdam by the tug Britannia when she broke in half off Lizard Point. The stern section was towed into Falmouth and the bow section was believed to be washed up between Hemmick Beach and Dodman Point.
 22 December –  ran aground on Hayle Bar.

1972
 27 January – the cruise ship  was driven aground in the Fowey Estuary after breaking free from her moorings in a storm.
 7 September – the crew of trawler  of Cherbourg were attempting to abandon ship after she went into a small cove at Land's End. Eight men were picked up by the Sennen Cove lifeboat Susan Ashley ( Royal National Lifeboat Institution).
 5 November – Nefili steamed into Dollar Cove, Land's End in fog when her radar failed. Crew saved by breeches-buoy. She sits directly on trawler La Varenne.

1973
 13 December – the fishing vessel Kergall of Guilvinec dragged her anchor while sheltering from a southerly gale and went ashore at Chyandour 100m west of Penzance railway station.

1975
 25 January – coaster Lovat sank in a WNW gale gusting to hurricane force, 25 miles south of Penzance. All crew were lost.

1977
 19 February – barge  wrecked to the south of Bude Haven
 September – Kerland: a trawler sinking off the Runnelstone was aided by the Isles of Scilly ferry RMV Scillonian III
 16 November – 449 tonne coaster the  cargo of rock salt shifted causing her to sink 12 miles north of Cape Cornwall. A silver medal was awarded to Coxswain Pengilly of Sennen Cove Lifeboat Diana White ( Royal National Lifeboat Institution).
 5 December – trawler Boston Sea Ranger of Lowestoft foundered off Gwennap Head during a southerly gale. Three survivors were picked up by the Sennen Cove relief Lifeboat Vincent Nesfield ( Royal National Lifeboat Institution)
 25 December – : The coaster sank off Cornwall, with loss of life including two children.
 26 December – on her first voyage after a major refit, the Conqueror of Grimsby went ashore at Penzer Point, south of Mousehole. It was believed the crew were down below having breakfast and the trawler was on automatic pilot! The Lifeboat Solomon Browne ( Royal National Lifeboat Institution) had insufficient power to tow the Conqueror off the rocks, assumed a 35° list and broke up on the rocks.

1978
 18 February – catamaran Floral Dancer of Falmouth fouled her rudder and propeller and towed into Whitesand Bay by the relief Lifeboat Vincent Nesfield ( Royal National Lifeboat Institution) and beached in the cove without damage.
 14 June – fishing vessel Deux Socurs of Newlyn caught fire and abandoned by her crew of three off the Longships.
 13 December – fishing vessel MFV Alcyon ( foundered north of Trevose Head
 30 December – trawler Ben Asdale drifted onto Maenporth Beach, Falmouth after fouling her rudder and being driven ashore in a force ten gale. Three lives lost.

1979
 15 December – cargo ship  ran aground west of Kellan Head, near Port Issac while en route from Garston to Algiers with lubricating oil.

1980
 4 January – Scottish pair trawler  sank in Mount's Bay with the loss of three lives.
 19 March – trawler Normauwil stranded near the north pier of Newlyn harbour and towed clear by the Lifeboat Solomon Browne ( Royal National Lifeboat Institution).
 13 November –  capsized near Padstow
 26 November –  capsized while in tow after engine failure near Port Isaac. She was in ballast from Londonderry to Par.

1981
 19 September –  sank south of Gwennap Head. The crew was saved by Lifeboat Diana White ( Royal National Lifeboat Institution) and RNAS Culdrose Sea King helicopter.
Eight crew lost from each vessel.

1982
 21 May – fishing vessel  caught fire north of Trevose Head.
 13 December – fishing vessel  went ashore at Carn Dhu near Mousehole.

1984
 unknown date – the St Ives lifeboat Frank Penfold Marshall ( Royal National Lifeboat Institution) rescued fourteen people from the coaster  and tug 

1985
 18 May – fishing vessel Sarah Jane overturned one mile west of the Cowloe Rocks. Her crew of one was rescued by the Lifeboat Diana White ( Royal National Lifeboat Institution).

1988
 6 February – Gillian Claire foundered on Hayle Bar.
 8 February – trawler Simone Marguerite ran ashore on the Cressars Rock, Penzance, in a SW gale after steering the wrong side of the pole. Refloated by the Penlee Lifeboat.
 September – trawler New Pioneer ran aground at Merthen Point, St Loy. The Penlee Lifeboat took off her three crew.

1989
 12 March – MV Secil Japan carrying timber wrecked on the North Cliffs near Godrevy.

1994
 26 July – fishing vessel  sprang a leak while on passage from Falmouth to Fowey and sank between Portholland and Porthluney Cove.
 24 November –  capsized NW of Bude Haven.

1995
 30 May – sailing ship Maria Asumpta wrecked on Pentire Head with the loss of three lives. She was launched in 1858 from the beach at Badalona, Spain.

1997
11 March – St Ives fishing vessel Gorah Lass'' sank north–east of St Ives. All three crew died.

2000
  wrecked at Mousehole.

See also

 List of shipwrecks of Cornwall
 List of shipwrecks of the Isles of Scilly
 Protection of Wrecks Act 1973
 List of U-boats of Germany

References

External links
 Protected Wreck Sites English Heritage
 Map of Designated Sites in UK English Heritage

Cornwall
 
Shipwrecks
Shipwrecks in the English Channel
20th-century maritime incidents
20th century in Cornwall
Cornwall